Tales of Winter: Selections from the TSO Rock Operas is the first compilation album produced by the Trans-Siberian Orchestra. This album features songs from their first five albums.

Track listing

Personnel 
 Paul O'Neill - Producer
 Robert Kinkel - Producer
 Dave Wittman - Recording & Mix Engineer

Performers 

Backup:
 Steve Broderick
 Luci Butler
 Jennifer Cella
 Britney Christian
 Rob Evan
 Dina Fanai
 Tommy Farese
 Allison Flom
 Tony Gaynor
 Christie George
 Alexa Goddard
 Kristin Lewis Gorman
 Erin Henry
 Steena Hernandez
 Kelly Keeling
 Robert Kinkel
 Danielle Landherr
 James Lewis
 Tany Ling
 Sanya Mateyas
 Ireland Wilde O'Neill
 Jennifer Cella
 Valentina Porter
 Andrew Ross
 Bart Shatto
 Evan Shyer
 Abby Skoff
 Zachary Stevens
Jeff Scott Soto
 Adrienne Warren
 Scout Xavier

Guide:
 Bryan Hicks - "Epiphany"
 Dina Fanai - "Night Enchanted"
 Robert Kinkel - "Night Enchanted"

Gospel Choir:
 Keith Jacobs
 Lucille Jacobs
 Nathaniel Jacobs
 Shelia Upshaw

Child Choir:
 The American Boychoir, directed by Fernando Malvar-Ruiz

Vietnamese Dialogue:
 Truc Xuan Le
 Khanh Ong
 Nhattien Nguyen
 Nga Nguyen

Instruments 
Band:
 Paul O'Neill - Guitars
 Robert Kinkel - Keyboards
 Jon Oliva - Keyboards
 Al Pitrelli - Lead & Rhythm Guitars
 Chris Altenhoff - Bass
 Luci Butler - Keyboards
 Chris Caffery - Guitars
 Shih-Yi Chiang - Keyboards
 Roddy Chong - Violin
 Angus Clark - Guitars
 Jane Mangini - Keyboards
 Johnny Lee Middleton - Bass
 John O. Reilly - Drums
 Anna Phoebe - Violin
 Jeff Plate - Drums
 Alex Skolnick - Guitars
 Derek Wieland - Keyboards
 Dave Wittman - Drum, Guitar, & Bass Inserts

Strings:
 Roddy Chong
 Caitlin Moe
 Anna Phoebe
 Allison Zlotow
 Lowell Adams
 Karen Dumke
 Lei Liu
 Chizuko Matsusaka
 Sarah Shellman

References

External links 
 Official Site

2013 compilation albums
Trans-Siberian Orchestra albums
Albums produced by Paul O'Neill (rock producer)
Lava Records compilation albums